Narvi (also Romanized as Narvī) is a village in Sirvan Rural District, Nowsud District, Paveh County, Kermanshah Province, Iran. At the 2006 census, its population was 455, in 132 families.

References 

Populated places in Paveh County